Deocloninae is a subfamily of moths in the family Autostichidae.

Taxonomy and systematics
 Deoclona Busck, 1903

References

Deocloninae at funet

 
Autostichidae
Moth subfamilies